Blackfriars, Norwich was a friary in Norfolk, England.

References

Monasteries in Norfolk
History of Norwich